Udo is a masculine given name.

Udo or UDO may also refer to:

Places
Udo (island), an islet off Jeju Island, South Korea

Culture
U.D.O., heavy metal band formed in 1987
United Dance Organisation (UDO), world’s largest street dance organisation
Udo-jingū, a Shinto shrine in Nichinan, Miyazaki prefecture, Japan
Udo the Red Panda, mascot of the University of Mannheim
Tommy Udo, a character in the 1947 film Kiss of Death

Other uses
UDO (markup language), a lightweight markup language
Ultra Density Optical (UDO), an optical disk format for data storage
Unified Development Ordinance (UDO), a local policy instrument combining zoning and other regulations
Udo, a common name for the Japanese flowering plant Aralia cordata

See also
Siege of Udo, 1600, Japan
Odo, a name